Adventure learning is a hybrid distance education approach pioneered at St. Thomas University in the 1990s and defined in 2006 by Aaron Doering of the University of Minnesota.

History 
In the early 1990s, explorers such as Will Steger, Dan Buettner, Robert Ballard, Lonnie Dupree, Paul Pregont, and Mille Porsild began experimenting with ways to use technology to connect classrooms with their experiences on the trail. The Jason program (founded by Ballard) pushed the envelope of transmitting from the field as they communicated while diving the ocean, and Classroom Connect (founded by Buetner) generated a comprehensive curriculum and learning objectives tied to the field experiences, drawing in learners with their "student-choose-the-route" approach. NOMADS Online Classroom Expeditions (founded by Pregont & Porsild) facilitated the first full-scale adventure learning program with Arctic Blast 2001. Defining advances were made with student, educators and subject-matter experts being able to collaborate online on tasks within a secure space as well as participate in moderated chats using Lotus Notes, Sametime Chat, and Quickplaces, earning the IBM Beacon Award for best educational use worldwide of IBM technologies in 2002. In this way PolarHusky.com was established; the largest scale adventure learning programming to date, with participation of more than 7000 schools in 38 countries on five continents.

In 2006, based upon research and collaboration with PolarHusky.com, Aaron Doering published the first established definition, framework, and guiding principles of adventure learning. The guiding principles were refined by Doering and Charles Miller in 2009. The first adventure learning program “supported by theory and long-term research” was the GoNorth! Adventure Learning Series of circumpolar Arctic dogsledding expeditions at PolarHusky.com which reached millions of learners worldwide and explored such topics as sustainability, the environment, science, and traditional cultures. Other examples of adventure learning projects include Earthducation, the Jason Project, Ride To Learn with the To Learn Series, and the Quest series of bicycle treks.

References

Further reading 
 Doering, A., & Henrickson, J. (2015). Fostering creativity through inquiry and adventure in informal learning environment design. Journal of Technology and Teacher Education, 23(3), 387-410.
 Doering, A., & Henrickson, J. (2015). Into the mountains. Sidetracked. [online serial]
 Doering, A., & Henrickson, J. (2014). Designing for learning engagement in remote communities: Narratives from North of Sixty. Canadian Journal of Learning and Technology, 40(3), 1-26.
 Doering, A. (2014). Land of extremes. Sidetracked Magazine, volume 2, 98-107.
 Doering, A. (2014). Crossing the Arctic: A six-month expedition. Adventure.com. [online serial]
 Doering, A., & Henrickson, J. (2014). What do education and sustainability mean to you? An inside look at Earthducation. Climasphere: The world's climate change resource.
 Doering, A., & Henrickson, J. (2013). The land that never melts. Sidetracked. [online serial]
 Henrickson, J., & Doering, A. (2013). Adventure learning and learner-engagement: Frameworks for designers and educators. Journal of Interactive Learning Research, 24(4), 397-424.
 Henrickson, J., & Doering, A. (2013). Teaching sustainability through adventure. Journal of Sustainability Education.
 Miller, B. G., Doering, A., Roehrig, G., & Shimek, R. (2012). Fostering indigenous STEM education: Mobilizing the adventure learning framework through snow snakes. Journal of American Indian Education, 51(2), 66-84.
 Veletsianos, G., Doering, A., & Henrickson, J. (2012). Field-based professional development of teachers engaged in distance education: experiences from the Arctic. Distance Education, 33(1), 45-59.
 Koseoglu, S., & Doering, A. (2011). Understanding Complex Ecologies: An Investigation of Student Experiences in Adventure Learning Programs. Distance Education, 32(3), 339-355.
 Moos, D., and Honkomp, B. (2011). Adventure learning: Motivating students in a Minnesota middle school. Journal of Research on Technology in Education, 43(3), 231–252.
 Doering, A., Scharber, C., Riedel, E. & Miller, C. (2010). “Timber for President”: Adventure Learning and Motivation. Journal of Interactive Learning Research, 21(4), 483-513.
 Veletsianos, G., & Doering, A. (2010). Long-term student experiences in a hybrid, open-ended and problem based Adventure Learning program. Australasian Journal of Educational Technology, 26(2), 280-296.
 Veletsianos, G. (2010). A small-scale adventure learning activity and its implications for higher education practice and research. in education, 16(1).
 Veletsianos, G., & Kleanthous, I. (2009). A review of adventure learning. International Review of Research in Open and Distance Learning, 10(6), 84–105.
 Veletsianos, G. & Eliadou, A. (2009). Conceptualizing the Use of Technology to Foster Peace via Adventure Learning. The Internet and Higher Education, 12, 63-70.
 Doering, A., & Veletsianos, G. (2008). What lies beyond effectiveness and efficiency? Adventure Learning Design. The Internet and Higher Education, 11(3-4), 137-144.
 Miller, C., Veletsianos, G., & Doering, A. (2008). Curriculum at forty below: A phenomenological inquiry of an educator explorer's experiences with adventure learning in the Arctic. Distance Education, 29(3), 253-267.
 Doering, A., & Veletsianos, G. (2008). Hybrid online education: Identifying integration models using Adventure Learning. Journal of Research on Technology in Education, 41(1), 101-119.
 Doering, A., Miller, C., & Veletsianos, G. (2008). Adventure Learning: Educational, social, and technological affordances for collaborative hybrid distance education. Quarterly Review of Distance Education, 9(3), 249-266.
 Doering, A., & Veletsianos, G. (2007). Multi-Scaffolding Learning Environment: An Analysis of Scaffolding and Its Impact on Cognitive Load and Problem-Solving Ability. Journal of Educational Computing Research, 37(2), 107-129.
 Doering, A. (2006). Adventure learning: Transformative hybrid online education. Distance Education, 27(2), 197-215.
 Enloe, W., Fallon, T., & Goetz, S (2000). Project Circles: The World School for Adventure Learning. Center for Global Environmental Education, University of Hamline.

Pedagogy
Educational practices
Education in the United States